Johnny Ruger (born January 1, 1949) is an American biathlete. He competed in the 20 km individual event at the 1980 Winter Olympics.

References

1949 births
Living people
American male biathletes
Olympic biathletes of the United States
Biathletes at the 1980 Winter Olympics
Place of birth missing (living people)
20th-century American people